Demente criminal (English: Criminal Mastermind) is a television series produced by Venevisión and Univisión. The series is based on the crime novel titled Sangre en el Diván written by Ibéyise Pacheco and is adapted by Rosa Clemente y Raul Prieto. The series is based on the life of Dr. Edmundo Chirinos.

Sebastián Ligarde and Lorena Rojas star as the main protagonists.

Univision Puerto Rico began airing Demente Criminal from April 1, 2015 at 10:00 PM. Venevisión began transmitting the series under the title Demente from June 16, 2015 at 11:00 PM.

Cast

Main cast 
Lorena Rojas as Verónica García
Sebastián Ligarde as Raimundo Acosta
Gabriel Valenzuela as Julio Villalobos
María Fernanda Yepes as Gabriela Fons
Marcela Mar as Laura Montesinos
Isabella Santodomingo as Consuelo de Morand

Supporting cast 
Carlos Mata as Gastón Quiroz
Carlos Yustis as Gastón Quiroz
Roberto San Martín as Gerardo Pinzón
Alberto Mateo 
Mauricio Rentería
Teresa Maria Rojas
Gilda Haddock as Henrika
Natasha Domínguez as Marcela Celaya
Sol Rodríguez as Fernanda Sánchez
Lance Dos Ramos as Anthony
Carolina Ayala as Marisol
Andrea Nuñez as Eliana
Ana Osorio as Samantha
Kevin Aponte as Juan Pedro
Luke Grande as Sarampión
Deive Garcés as René
Germán Barrios as Miguel 
Pedro Telémaco as Ruiz

Extended cast 
Enrique Alejandro as Billy
Joemy Blanco as Sofía Sánchez
Joey Montana as Reo
Javier Valcárcel
Eduardo Serrano
Crisol Carabal

Special participation 
Thamara Aguilar as Alicia Celaya
Fernando Carrera as Raúl Morand
Rolando Tarajano as Ezequiel Posada
Ana Lorena Sánchez as Carla
Plutarco Haza as Camilo
 Alejandro D' Carlo as Doctor Alirio

References

External links

2015 telenovelas
2015 Venezuelan television series debuts
2015 American television series debuts
2015 Colombian television series debuts
Venezuelan telenovelas
Colombian telenovelas
American telenovelas
Spanish-language American telenovelas
Spanish-language telenovelas
2015 Venezuelan television series endings
2015 American television series endings
2015 Colombian television series endings
Television shows set in Miami